Krzysztof Gajtkowski (born September 26, 1980 in Bytom) is a former Polish footballer who played as a striker.

Career

Club
In January 2011, he joined Warta Poznań.

Trivia
 He missed the first half of the 2006-2007 season battling a serious injury.

References

External links
 

1980 births
Living people
Sportspeople from Bytom
Polish footballers
GKS Katowice players
Lech Poznań players
Korona Kielce players
Warta Poznań players
Polonia Warsaw players
Kolejarz Stróże players
Ekstraklasa players
Szombierki Bytom players

Association football forwards